Thomas W. Greene (born January 1, 1938) is a former American football quarterback and punter in the American Football League. He played for the Boston Patriots and Dallas Texans. He played college football for the Holy Cross Crusaders.

References

1938 births
Living people
American football quarterbacks
American football punters
Boston Patriots players
Dallas Texans (AFL) players
Holy Cross Crusaders football players